Lieutenant Leonard Arthur Christian was a Canadian World War I flying ace credited with nine aerial victories scored while he flew as an observer/gunner on Airco DH.9 bombers.

Early life
Christian was born on a farm near Armstrong, British Columbia, Canada on 9 May 1889. HIs parents were Josephine E. and Joseph W. Christian. He was a bachelor horse breeder until he joined the military for World War I.

World War I
Christian underwent pilot's training and graduated as a probationary Flying Officer in Bloody April 1917. However, because he was phobic about heights, he volunteered to serve as an aerial observer instead. He was posted to 6 Naval Squadron as an observer/gunner in Airco DH.9s and remained in the unit as it transformed into 206 Squadron of the Royal Air Force. Four months later, he began the victory tally that would run through 1 August 1918. He was awarded the Distinguished Flying Cross for his defensive valor during the 47 bombing raids that he flew.

His Distinguished Flying Cross was gazetted on 21 September 1918:

Lieutenant Leonard Arthur Christian (late R.N.A.S.)

{{Blockquote|"Since joining his squadron this officer has taken part in forty-seven bomb raids, displaying at all times keenness and determination, and rendering his pilot most valuable support. He has accounted for four enemy aeroplanes, destroying two, and driving down two out of control."<ref>(Supplement to the London Gazette," 21 September 1918, p. 11250.) http://www.london-gazette.co.uk/issues/30913/supplements/11250 Retrieved 3 July 2011.</ref>}}

List of aerial victories
Although trained as a pilot, Christian scored all his victories as an observer/gunner on a bomber.

See also Aerial victory standards of World War I

Post World War I
On 23 August 1919, Christian was placed on the Royal Air Force's unemployed list. He returned to his horse farm to breed race horses. He returned to service in the Royal Canadian Air Force for World War II.

Leonard Arthur Christian died on 23 January 1955 and is interred in Mountain View Cemetery and Crematorium in Vancouver, British Columbia, Canada.

References
 Franks, Norman; Guest, Russell; Alegi, Gregory. Above the War Fronts: the British Two-seater Bomber Pilot and Observer Aces, the British Two-seater Fighter Observer Aces, and the Belgian, Italian, Austro-Hungarian and Russian Fighter Aces, 1914-1918: Volume 4 of Fighting Airmen of WWI Series: Volume 4 of Air Aces of WWI.'' Grub Street, 1997. , .

Endnotes

1889 births
1955 deaths
Canadian World War I flying aces
People from the Okanagan
Royal Naval Air Service aviators
Recipients of the Distinguished Flying Cross (United Kingdom)